Jayden Jezairo Braaf (born 31 August 2002) is a Dutch professional footballer who plays as a forward for  club Hellas Verona, on loan from Borussia Dortmund.

Club career
A youth product of Ajax, PSV Eindhoven and Manchester City, on 1 February 2021, Braaf joined Italian side Udinese on loan until the end of the season. He made his debut with the club in a 1–0 Serie A win over Fiorentina on 28 February 2021 and scored his first goal in Serie A in a 4–2 win over Benevento on 25 April 2021.

On 27 May 2022, Braaf joined Borussia Dortmund on free transfer.

On 16 January 2023, he joined Serie A side Hellas Verona on loan until the end of the season, with an option to buy.

International career
Born in the Netherlands, Braaf is of Surinamese descent. He has played internationally for Netherlands at under-15, under-17 and under-18 levels.

Honours

Club

Manchester City
FA Youth Cup: 2019-20

Individual
Man City EDS Players Player of the Year: 2019-20

References

External links
 

2002 births
Living people
Footballers from Amsterdam
Dutch footballers
Netherlands youth international footballers
Dutch sportspeople of Surinamese descent
Association football forwards
Manchester City F.C. players
Udinese Calcio players
Borussia Dortmund II players
Hellas Verona F.C. players
Serie A players
3. Liga players
Dutch expatriate footballers
Dutch expatriate sportspeople in England
Expatriate footballers in England
Dutch expatriate sportspeople in Italy
Expatriate footballers in Italy
Dutch expatriate sportspeople in Germany
Expatriate footballers in Germany